Iosef Mikhailovich Oranski (24 April 1923 – 16 May 1977), sometimes spelled Iosef Mikhailovich Oranskii, was a prominent Soviet linguist affiliated with the Leningrad Institute of Oriental Studies. His work on Iranian languages, as well as on Turkic and Indo-Aryan languages relating to Central Asia, are considered seminal.

References

External links 
 Encyclopaedia Iranica article on I.M. Oranski

Linguists from Russia
1923 births
1977 deaths
20th-century linguists
Linguists from the Soviet Union